Portland International Airport, or just Airport on station signage, is a light rail station in Portland, Oregon, United States, served by TriMet as part of the MAX Light Rail system. It serves Portland International Airport as the eastern terminus of the Red Line, which connects travelers to downtown Portland and Beaverton. The station is attached to ground floor of the main passenger terminal, near the southern end of the arrivals hall and baggage claim area. It features a wedge-shaped island platform, just beyond which both tracks join because the section approaching the terminal is single-tracked.

Portland International Airport station was built as part of the Airport MAX project; construction began in July 2000, and it opened on September 10, 2001. Trains serve it for 22 hours daily with headways of 15 minutes during most of the day. In late 2018, the station recorded an average of 2,461 weekday boardings.

History

Portland's regional transit agency, TriMet, had served Portland International Airport with bus routes since 1970, notably with route 12–Sandy Boulevard since 1986, the same year planners from Metro (the Portland metropolitan area's regional government) first proposed an airport light rail line. Early plans envisioned a line running from Clackamas to the airport via Interstate 205 (I-205) using rights-of-way provided by the I-205 busway, which was originally built to accommodate a bus rapid transit line that never operated. In 1991, the Port of Portland adopted a multi-phased, $300 million airport master plan to address expected passenger traffic growth through 2010; the plan raised the capacity of the main passenger terminal building, as well as provisioned for a future light rail station outside the terminal's arrivals hall. By 1994, travelers using the airport had risen by 34 percent, far exceeding the Port's projections. Port officials, struggling to meet the surge in demand, moved to accelerate airport light rail plans, which regional planners did not anticipate until the late 2000s. TriMet—which by then was operating the region's light rail system called Metropolitan Area Express (MAX)—also aimed to complete its Westside MAX and the South/North Corridor projects before it would consider extending MAX to the airport.

In 1996, engineering firm Bechtel approached the Port with an unsolicited proposal to build the airport line. After negotiations between Bechtel, the Port, and local jurisdictions, Bechtel was granted the design–build contract for the light rail extension in exchange for development rights to the  Portland International Center, the largest commercially zoned property in Portland at the time. Bechtel later developed this property and renamed it Cascade Station. The Port projected the airport terminal station to cost $8.4 million and allocated a $3 ticket fee to fund its construction. Delta Airlines, Reno Air, and United Airlines protested the use of ticket fees but the Federal Aviation Administration authorized it in May 1999. Construction of the Airport MAX extension commenced the following month.

On September 10, 2001, the station opened along with the entire Airport MAX extension that introduced Red Line service between downtown Portland and the airport. Celebrations planned for the following weekend were canceled following the September 11 attacks, and the airport was closed for three days. Planners projected single-car trains to initially serve Portland International Airport station but TriMet deployed two-car consists on the line after recording 3,800 riders over Thanksgiving weekend in November 2001. In September 2003, TriMet extended Red Line service farther west using the existing Westside MAX tracks to Beaverton Transit Center. This was done in an effort to provide a one-seat ride to the airport for westside riders. In 2006, the station handled more than one million passengers in a single year for the first time.

TriMet had reintroduced bus service to the airport with the 272–PDX Night Bus route on September 2, 2018. The bus route ran in the late night and early morning hours when the Red Line was not operating. It was indefinitely suspended on April 5, 2020, amid the COVID-19 pandemic.

Station details

The station's platform is situated at ground level just outside the main passenger terminal, near the southernmost entrance and within  of the baggage claim area. It features a wedge-shaped island platform and a glass canopy designed by ZGF Architects, which also designed the airport terminal's main-entrance canopy. An 80-seat station lobby is located inside the terminal and has ticket vending machines and real-time displays showing train departure times. The station occupies the end of a single-track section of the Airport MAX segment; the only other such section on the MAX system is located on another segment of the Airport MAX near Gateway/Northeast 99th Avenue Transit Center.

Public art

Public art pieces commissioned for the Airport MAX Project have a common theme of "flight". The station houses one art installation as part of TriMet's Public Art Program, which is funded at 1.5 percent of a project's total cost. Time Flies by Christine Bourdette is a large, porcelain enamel mural that is displayed on a wall between the station platform and the baggage claim area. The work is described as "a sequence of images related to time and motion".  Bourdette also installed bronze rails that lead passengers from the escalators to the platform and blue chevrons on the platform pavement to depict movement.

Services

Portland International Airport station is served by TriMet's MAX Red Line, which connects the airport to Northeast Portland, Portland City Center, and central Beaverton. In late 2018, the station recorded an average of 2,461 boardings on weekdays. The day's first train arrives from Beaverton Transit Center. The last three westbound trips travel eastbound to Ruby Junction/East 197th Avenue station as through services of the Blue Line. Headway between trains varies from 15 minutes for most of the day to 30 minutes during the early mornings and late evenings. Services operate on all days of the week and are the most frequent on weekdays. Trains from the station take approximately 40 minutes to reach Pioneer Square in downtown Portland—where transfers to all lines are available—and approximately 65 minutes to reach the other end of the line at Beaverton Transit Center.

References

External links

2001 establishments in Oregon
Portland
MAX Light Rail stations
MAX Red Line
Station
Railway stations in Portland, Oregon
Railway stations in the United States opened in 2001